The PF3 Platform has been developed by engineers of the PSA Peugeot Citroën group for large and medium sized cars with front wheel drive and transverse engine. 

The first application using the PF3 platform is the 2001 Citroën C5. PSA PF3 was a global mid-size platform used by various models produced by Citroën and Peugeot.

From 2013, PSA started to use the new EMP2 platform for future models, starting with the new Peugeot 308.

Models
Vehicles based on the PF3 Platform:
Short wheelbase
 2001-2008 Citroën C5 I
 2004-2010 Peugeot 407
 2008-2017 Citroën C5 II
 2010-2018 Peugeot 508 I
Long wheelbase
 2005-2012 Citroën C6

References

External links
 Platform guide

PSA platforms